Marco Armellini (born 17 August 1960) is a former professional tennis player from Italy.

Biography
Armellini comes from the northeastern Italian city of Udine.

A right-handed player, he played on the professional tour in the 1980s, reaching a career high singles ranking of 145. His best performance in a Grand Prix tournament was a quarter-final appearance at Palermo in 1980. He had wins over both world number 24 Eric Jelen and former top 10 player Juan Aguilera to make the round of 16 of the 1986 Austrian Open.

References

External links
 
 

1960 births
Living people
Italian male tennis players
Sportspeople from Udine
20th-century Italian people